Ryana Lucelle MacDonald-Gay (born 12 February 2004) is an English cricketer who currently plays for Kent, South East Stars and Oval Invincibles. She plays as a right-handed batter and right-arm medium bowler.

Early life
MacDonald-Gay was born on 12 February 2004 in Maidstone, Kent.

Domestic career
MacDonald-Gay made her county debut in 2019, for Kent against Sussex, taking 1/22 from her 3 overs. In 2021, she appeared in six matches as Kent won the South East Group of the Twenty20 Cup. In 2022, she was Kent's leading wicket-taker in the Twenty20 Cup, with 10 wickets at an average of 9.00. She made both her Twenty20 high score and best bowling figures in the competition, scoring 40* against Surrey and taking 4/19 against Hampshire.

MacDonald-Gay was named in the South East Stars Academy squad for the 2021 season. On 4 August, she scored 65 in a 70-run victory for the Academy over Western Storm Academy. On 30 August, it was announced that MacDonald-Gay had signed a senior contract with South East Stars, and she made her full debut for the team later that day, in a Charlotte Edwards Cup match against Central Sparks. She went on to play two further matches for the side, in the Rachael Heyhoe Flint Trophy, taking two wickets. In 2022, she played five matches for the side, across the Charlotte Edwards Cup and the Rachael Heyhoe Flint Trophy, and made her maiden List A half-century, scoring 54* against Lightning, as well as taking six wickets. She also played every match in the victorious The Hundred campaign of Oval Invincibles, taking five wickets at an average of 14.20. At the end of the 2022 season, it was announced that MacDonald-Gay had signed her first professional contract with South East Stars.

International career
In October 2022, MacDonald-Gay was selected in the England Under-19 squad for the 2023 ICC Under-19 Women's T20 World Cup. She played six matches in the tournament, taking four wickets and scoring 72 runs.

References

External links

2004 births
Living people
Sportspeople from Maidstone
Kent women cricketers
South East Stars cricketers
Oval Invincibles cricketers